Zachary Henry Curlin (January 31, 1890 – June 3, 1970) was an American football and basketball player and coach.

Background and career
Curlin attended Christian Brothers College (now University) in Memphis and the Webb School. and played piano in the band. He was a halfback and quarterback on Dan McGugin's Vanderbilt Commodores football teams from 1910 to 1913, and the starting quarterback in 1912 and 1913, leading Vandy to an SIAA title in 1912. He made kicks on both Harvard and Michigan. Curlin was pulled for his backup Rabbi Robbins in Vanderbilt's largest win its history, a 105–0 win over Bethel in 1912, the muddy conditions better suited to the other's talents. Curlin later served as the Memphis Tigers men's basketball coach for many years.

Legacy
Curlin was inducted into the M Club Hall of Fame in 1974 and a street on the south side of the university's campus bears his name. An award is given annually in his name that recognizes the top male student-athlete at the University of Memphis that possesses his "drive, enthusiasm and determination for academics and athletics while maintaining a concern for others."

Head coaching record

Football

References

External links
 

1890 births
1970 deaths
American men's basketball players
American football drop kickers
American football quarterbacks
Memphis Tigers athletic directors
Memphis Tigers baseball coaches
Memphis Tigers football coaches
Memphis Tigers men's basketball coaches
Vanderbilt Commodores football players
Vanderbilt Commodores men's basketball players
Christian Brothers University alumni
People from Mississippi County, Arkansas
Coaches of American football from Tennessee
Players of American football from Memphis, Tennessee
Basketball coaches from Tennessee
Basketball players from Memphis, Tennessee